

Yugoslav Americans are Americans of full or partial Yugoslav ancestry. In the 2021 Community Surveys, there were 210,395 people who indicated Yugoslav or Yugoslav American as their ethnic origin; a steep and steady decrease from previous censuses (233,325 in 2019; 276,360 in 2016) and nearly a 36% decrease from the 2000 Census when there were over 328,000.

The total number of Americans whose origins lie in former Yugoslavia is unknown due to conflicting definitions and identifications; in descending order these were as per 2021 American Community Survey:

See also
 United States–Yugoslavia relations

Notes

References

External links
 

European-American society